Fawaz al-Rabihi is a citizen of Yemen who played a role in the terrorist attack on the French supertanker MV Limburg.
Al-Rabihi received a life sentence, while fellow captive Mohammed Hamdi al-Ahdal, also convicted of a role in the attack, received a three-year sentence.
He was captured by Yemeni authorities, escaped, and then killed in a gunbattle in 2005.

References

Yemeni people convicted of murder
2005 deaths
Year of birth missing